Ganga Sagar is a 1978 Bollywood film directed by Ashish Kumar (actor). The film stars Trilok Kapoor, Bela Bose, Bharat Bhushan, and Lalita Pawar.

Cast

Songs List

Vrat Yeh Karwa Chauth Ka (Akhand Aseem Atoot Rahe) Singer: Hemlata, Chandrani Mukherjee MD: Ravindra Jain Lyricist: Ravindra Jain

Naag Devta Meri Vinti Suno Re Singer: Hemlata MD: Ravindra Jain Lyricist: Ravindra Jain

Saare Tirath Baar Baar Gangasagar Ek Baar (Patit Paawani Ganga) Singer: Ravindra Jain MD: Ravindra Jain Lyricist: Ravindra Jain

O Ganga Maiya Aayi Gagan Se Dharti Pe Singer: Hemlata MD: Ravindra Jain Lyricist: Ravindra Jain

Jai Ho Jai Ho Ganga Ki Jai Ho Singer: Hemlata MD: Ravindra Jain Lyricist: Ravindra Jain

External links
 

1978 films
1970s Hindi-language films